Emilie (Ämilie, Aemilie) Juliane (19 August 1637 – 3 December 1706) was a German countess and hymn writer.

Biography
Emilie Juliane was a daughter of Count Albert Frederick I of Barby-Mühlingen and his wife, Sophia Ursula of Oldenburg-Delmenhorst. During the Thirty Years' War, her father and his family were compelled to seek refuge in the castle of Heidecksburg in Rudolstadt after being persecuted for their Lutheran Protestant faith. It belonged to his uncle, Count Louis Günther I of Schwarzburg-Rudolstadt, and Emilie was born there.

After the death of her father (in 1641) and mother (in 1642), she was adopted by her aunt Emilie of Oldenburg, who was also her godmother and had become the wife of Count Louis Günther. Emilie Juliane was educated at Rudolstadt with her cousins under the care of Ahasuerus Fritsch and other teachers. She received a good education in religion, Latin, history, among other sciences. She is regarded as a forerunner of pietism.

On 7 July 1665, she was married to her cousin, Count Albert Anton II of Schwarzburg-Rudolstadt. She was the most productive of German female hymn-writers, almost 600 hymns being attributed to her. Her hymns, such as "", are full of a deep love for her Saviour.

Her hymns "" (EG 329) and "" (EG 530) are contained in the Protestant hymnal Evangelisches Gesangbuch.

References

External links

 Ämilie Juliane von Schwarzburg-Rudolstadt
 Ämilie Juliane Gräfin zu Schwarzburg-Rudolstadt 
 Biography 
 Susanne Schuster: Aemilie Juliane von Schwarzburg-Rudolstadt / Mitten im Leben sind wir vom Tod umfangen Frauen und Reformation
 

1637 births
1706 deaths
People from Rudolstadt
People from Schwarzburg-Rudolstadt
German Lutherans
German countesses
German women poets
German Lutheran hymnwriters
Emilie Juliane
Women hymnwriters